Bartholomew Voorsanger is an American architect based in New York.

Biography
Voorsanger received a bachelor's degree with Honors from Princeton University, a master's degree in Architecture from Harvard University, and accepted in 2005 the title of Doctor Honoris Causa from the University of Architecture and Urbanism “Ion Mincu” in Bucharest, Romania. Prior to opening his practice, Voorsanger worked for three years with urban planner Vincent Ponte in Montreal, Quebec, Canada, followed by a decade as an Associate with I.M. Pei & Partners in New York.
 
Voorsanger, a Fellow of the AIA since 1985, has served on national and international design awards juries and has been a speaker at numerous symposia. He has authored many articles published in national and international design and art periodicals and participated in academic lectures, juries. He has had adjunct faculty appointments at the Rhode Island School of Design, Harvard University, Columbia University, and the University of Pennsylvania. The architect has also served as Chair of the Board of Advisors of the Temple Hoyne Buell Center for the Study of American Architecture at Columbia University, President of the AIA/New York Chapter, and worked with the New York Foundation for Architecture. In addition, he has served as a member of the editorial board of the Harvard University Graduate School of Design Magazine, Chair of Design Review for the Port Authority of New York & New Jersey, and on the Board of the Society of Architectural Historians.

In late 2016, Oro Press published a monograph on Voorsanger's life and work, UNFOLDED: How Architecture Saved My Life, written by Alastair Gordon.

Work 
The architecture of Bartholomew Voorsanger's has gained both international and national recognition as well as acclaim from the general public. His work includes the Garden Court at Pierpont Morgan Library (completed in 1994 - demolished 2001), as well as The Asia Society Museum - particularly its public space on the ground floor (completed in 2001), which represents a "fluid space where nature meets high tech".

The private character of his residential buildings both captures nature and light through carefully calibrated and restrained architectonic gestures, and brings nature and light inside his houses, wherever they may be: Colorado, Arizona, Virginia, California, or Dubai. This is done in the spirit of American artists such as Frederic Edwin Church and his depiction of the landscape of the Americas.
 
The firm Voorsanger & Mills (est. 1978), was restructured as Voorsanger Architects PC in 1990, with Voorsanger as the Principal of the firm responsible for design. Voorsanger’s architecture projects have been published both nationally and internationally. His earlier projects include studies for New York University, including Midtown Center (with Edward Mills), the Graduate and Undergraduate dormitories, and the Center for Advanced Digital Studies. Notable later projects include the International Competition for The Brooklyn Museum Master Plan, The Pierpont Morgan Library Garden Court, Eugenio Maria de Hostos Community College (with Hirsch Danois Architects), the Air Traffic Control Tower at LaGuardia, the Asia Society and Museum in New York, Terminal B at Newark International Airport, and the Master Plan for the University of Virginia Art Museum.
 
Notable residential projects the firm has built include Wildcat Ridge in Snowmass, Colorado, the Blue Ridge Residence in Charlottesville, a villa in Tucson, a villas and apartment complex in Dubai, and a recently completed residence in the Napa Valley. Voorsanger was commissioned to design the National World War II Museum in New Orleans  as a result of a competition. The first three phases (with Mathes Brierre Architects) have been completed and already open to the public; additional phases are still under construction. Voorsanger's proposal has been selected for the new National Military Museum in Abu Dhabi of the United Arab Emirates design competition.
 
The Firm’s projects have been recognized internationally, nationally, and locally through the numerous awards and exhibitions at museums and galleries such as the Museum of Modern Art in New York, the Frankfurt Museum of Architecture, the Museum of Finnish Architecture, Ministerio de Obras Publicas Gallery in Madrid, Spain, the AA School of Architecture in London, Harvard University, the Hudson River Museum, the National Academy of Design, the AIA/NYC Center for Architecture, and New York University.

Selected Projects

 The United Arab Emirates National Military Museum, Abu Dhabi 
 Mudon City, Dubai
 Napa Valley Residence, Napa, California
 The National World War II Museum (with Mathes Brierre Architects), New Orleans, Louisiana (formerly the D Day Museum) 
 Olana Museum & Visitor Center, Hudson, New York
 University of Virginia Art Museum, Charlottesville, Virginia
 Elie Tahari Fashion Design Office, Milburn, NJ
 Asia Society & Museum, New York, NY
 Wildcat Ridge Residence, Snowmass, Colorado
 Blue Ridge Residence, Charlottesville, Virginia
 Coronado Ridge Residence, Tucson, Arizona 
 Birch Creek Residence, Lima Montana
 Waldron Residence, Martha’s Vineyard
 LaGuardia Air Traffic Control Tower, New York, NY
 JFK Airport/Impact Studies of AGT
 Pedestrian Distribution Systems to Selected Terminals
 The Pierpont Morgan Library Master Plan and Expansion
 Brooklyn Museum Master Plan Competition
 AGT Project/Port Authority (Monorail) Manhattan-JFK
 CBS Theatrical Film
 Friede Residence
 Eugenio Maria de Hostos Community College Allied Health Complex (with Hirsch Danois Architects), Bronx, New York
 Park Tower Reality
 Le Cygne Restaurant
 AGT Project/Port Authority: (Monorail) Environmental, Impact Statement
 NYC/AIA Headquarters
 New York University: Graduate & Undergraduate Dormitories
 New York University Midtown Center

Select Awards
Napa Valley Residence
The Chicago Athenaeum & The European Centre for Architecture Art Design
The American Architecture Award

The National World War II Museum
Society of American Registered Architects, Pennsylvania,
Design Award of Excellence, 2012
The Chicago Athenaeum & The European Centre for Architecture Art Design, The American Architecture Award
The Precast/Prestressed Concrete Institute Design Award

Wildcat Ridge Residence Snowmass, Colorado
Residential Architect Grand Award
American Institute of Architects (AIA) Housing Award
American Institute of Architects/NY State Merit Award
American Institute of Architects/NYC Merit Award
The National Academy of Design
2007 Lenard Kester Annual Prize & The Samuel F.B. Morse Medal

Blue Ridge Residence Charlottesville, Virginia
American Institute of Architects/NY State Excellence Award
American Institute of Architects/NYC Merit Award

Elie Tahari Fashion Design Offices & Warehouse
Chicago Athenaeum American Architecture Award
National AIA Interior Architecture Award 
American Institute of Architects/New Jersey Honor Award
American Institute of Architects/NYC Merit Award

Asia Society and Museum 
The National Academy of Design, Cannon Prize

Hostos Community College Allied Health Complex
The American Institute of Architects National Honor Award
New York Art Commission, Office of the Mayor Award for Excellence in Design
New York State Association of Architects Design Award
City Club of New York: Albert S. Bard Award

Le Cygne Restaurant
Interiors Magazine Fifth Annual Interiors Award
American Institute of Architects New York Chapter
Architecture Magazine National Design Award
AIA/NYC Chapter Distinguished Architecture Citation

NYU Graduate School of Business
Administration Library National AIA Library Buildings Award

NYU Midtown Center
NY State Association of Architects Excellence in Design Award

Pierpont Morgan Library
Landmarks Preservation Commission Award  
Tucker Award of Design Excellence, Building Stone Institute

Waldron House, Martha’s Vineyard, Mass.
American Institute of Architects National Better Homes for Living Competition

References 

 Bartholomew Voorsanger Unfolded: how architecture save my life. By Alastair Gordon. Gordeon de Vries Studio, Novato, CA. 2017.

1937 births
Living people
Princeton University alumni
American architects
Harvard Graduate School of Design alumni
Architects from Detroit